County General Hospital may refer to:

Durham County General Hospital in North Carolina
Hennepin County General Hospital In Minnesota
Howard County General Hospital in Maryland
Los Angeles County General Hospital in California, now known as LAC+USC Medical Center
General Hospital, which used Los Angeles County General Hospital for establishing shots
Tillamook County General Hospital in Oregon
The fictional Chicago hospital in the TV series ER